The ABC Saturday Superstar Movie — retitled The New Saturday Superstar Movie for its second season — is a series of one-hour animated made-for-television films (some of which also contained live action sequences), broadcast on the ABC television network on Saturday mornings from September 9, 1972 to November 17, 1973.

Intended as a version of the ABC Movie of the Week for kids, this series was produced by several production companies — including Hanna-Barbera, Filmation and Rankin/Bass — and mostly contained features based on popular cartoon characters and TV shows of the time, such as Yogi Bear, The Brady Bunch and Lost in Space. Some of the films served as pilots for new TV series.

The theme music and main titles were composed by Steve Zuckerman.

List of episodes

Season 1

Season 2
For the second season, the series was retitled The New Saturday Superstar Movie.

Home video
Five of the above films have been released on VHS videocassette:
 "Mad, Mad, Mad Monsters"
 "Willie Mays and the Say-Hey Kid"
 "Oliver and the Artful Dodger"
 "The Banana Splits in Hocus Pocus Park"
 "Lassie and the Spirit of Thunder Mountain", along with the Lassie's Rescue Rangers episode "Lost."

"Mad, Mad, Mad Monsters", "Yogi's Ark Lark" and "The Brady Kids on Mysterious Island" have been released on DVD, the latter two on the complete series releases for Yogi's Gang and The Brady Kids, respectively.

"The Adventures of Robin Hoodnik" and "Oliver and the Artful Dodger" have been released on DVD as part of a two-disc set titled Hanna-Barbera Specials Collection.

"Lost In Space" was included on the Lost In Space complete series Blu-ray set.

See also

 Hanna-Barbera Superstars 10
 The New Scooby-Doo Movies (another hour-long Saturday morning cartoon "movie" series on CBS)
 ABC Weekend Special

References

External links
 
 Toon Tracker: The ABC Saturday Superstar Movies
 Filmation features
 Hanna-Barbera features
 Features by other producers

 
1972 American television series debuts
1973 American television series endings
1970s American animated television series
American children's animated adventure television series
American children's animated comedy television series
American children's animated fantasy television series
American Broadcasting Company original programming
Topcraft
English-language television shows
American motion picture television series
Television series by Hanna-Barbera
Filmation
Rankin/Bass Productions